Jackie Fisher may refer to:

 John Fisher, 1st Baron Fisher (1841–1920), or Jacky Fisher, British admiral
 Jackie Fisher (footballer, born 1897) (1897–1954), English footballer
 Jackie Fisher (footballer, born 1925) (1925–2022), English footballer

See also
 John Fisher (disambiguation)